Garkarud (also Romanized as Garkarūd, Garkorūd, and Garkrūd; also known as Garkūrūd) is a village in Shabkhus Lat Rural District, Rankuh District, Amlash County, Gilan Province, Iran. At the 2006 census, its population was 1,519, in 409 families.

References 

Populated places in Amlash County